"Favourite Things" is a song by British hip hop and R&B group Big Brovaz from their 2002 debut album, Nu-Flow. The album was re-released for a third time only six weeks after the previous re-issue to include "Favourite Things", which was not contained on either of the previous two issues of the album. The track was released as the album's third single on 5 May 2003. The song is based on "My Favourite Things" from the musical The Sound of Music.

"Favourite Things" became Big Brovaz' third UK top-10 hit, peaking at number two and spending three months inside the top 75 of the UK Singles Chart. It is their highest-charting single in the UK. Despite "OK" being a failure in Australia, "Favourite Things" returned the group to the top 10 of the Australian Singles Chart, peaking at number three, matching the peak of the group's debut single "Nu Flow", and receiving a Gold certification. The video for the song consists mainly of the group at a funfair with bright lights and a merry-go-round.

Background
The song is based upon a popular song from the musical The Sound of Music, "My Favourite Things". The single follows the same basic tune of the original song, but lyrically as the "favourite things" are focused on expensive and glamorous objects that the group wanted, such as "diamonds and rubies and crazy bow Bentleys, Gucci dresses and drop top Kompressor". This is in contrast to the original song that typically focusses on thoroughly simple and non-glamorous pleasures. The group also recorded a version of the original "My Favourite Things" song, including it as a bonus hidden track on their debut album and also featuring it on the CD single of "Favourite Things".

Track listings

UK CD1
 "Favourite Things" (album version) – 3:47
 "Favourite Things" (Blacksmith remix) – 4:33
 "Favourite Things" (The Beat Digglerz remix) – 3:36
 "My Favourite Things" (original version) – 2:18
 "Favourite Things" (video version) – 3:47

UK CD2
 "Favourite Things" (album version) – 3:47
 "Favourite Things" (Kardinal Beats remix) – 4:00
 "Favourite Things" (Trackboyz remix) – 3:53
 "My Favourite Things" (original version) – 2:18

European CD single
 "Favourite Things" (album version) – 3:47
 "My Favourite Things" (original version) – 2:18

Australian CD single
 "Favourite Things" (album version) – 3:41
 "Favourite Things" (Kardinal Beats remix) – 4:01
 "Favourite Things" (Trackboyz remix) – 3:53
 "Favourite Things" (Juliano Creator and the Beat Digglerz remix) – 3:35
 "My Favourite Things" (original version) – 2:14

Charts

Weekly charts

Year-end charts

Certifications

Release history

References

2002 songs
2003 singles
Big Brovaz songs
Daylight Records singles
Epic Records singles
Songs with lyrics by Oscar Hammerstein II
Songs with music by Richard Rodgers